Woolungasaurus ('Woolunga lizard', named after an Aboriginal mythical reptile, Persson 1960) is a dubious genus of plesiosaur, an extinct marine reptile, belonging to the Elasmosauridae.

The type species, Woolungasaurus glendowerensis, was named after Glendower Station by Per Ove Persson in 1960, is known from a partial skeleton, holotype QM F6890, (forty-six vertebrae, ribs, forearms, shoulder girdle and part of the rear limbs) unearthed from the Wallumbilla Formation (Albian, Lower Cretaceous) of the Richmond District, Queensland, Australia. Another find of undetermined species, consisting of twelve vertebrae, was unearthed from the Maree Formation (Cretaceous, of uncertain age) of Neales River, near Lake Eyre, South Australia. A skull formerly referred to this genus from Yambore Creek, near Maxwelton, Queensland, is now the holotype of Eromangasaurus.

However, because of the uninformative, flawed diagnosis of Persson (1960), Welles (1962) considered Woolungasaurus a nomen dubium. In 2004, the genus was referred to Styxosaurus by Sven Sachs in 2004. Kear (2005) disagreed with this view and followed the interpretation by Welles (1962), rendering the genus to be an indeterminate elasmosaurid.

See also

 List of plesiosaur genera
 Timeline of plesiosaur research

Notes

References
 Long, J.A. 1998. Dinosaurs of Australia and New Zealand. UNSW Press.

Early Cretaceous plesiosaurs
Early Cretaceous reptiles of Australia
Elasmosaurids
Plesiosaurs of Oceania
Fossil taxa described in 1960
Sauropterygian genera